Jalan Bukit Serampang (Johor state route J34) is a main state road in Johor, Malaysia.

List of junctions

Roads in Johor
Muar District